Martha Knows Best was an American reality television series which aired on HGTV. Filmed during the COVID-19 pandemic, it followed Martha Stewart at her Bedford, New York farm as she completed gardening and other household projects, surprised fans, and dispensed domestic advice to her celebrity friends. Its second season focused on autumn and winter holiday projects.

Guest Stars
 Drew Barrymore
 Lorraine Bracco
 Lauren Conrad
 Jamie Lee Curtis
 Snoop Dogg
 Richard Gere
 Chelsea Handler
 Derek Hough
 Kate Hudson
 Ice-T
 DJ Khaled
 Hoda Kotb
 Denis Leary
 Jay Leno
 Post Malone
 Lupita Nyong'o
 Leslie Odom Jr.
 Antoni Porowski

Awards and Nominations
Martha Knows Best was nominated for "Best Lifestyle: Home/Garden Show" at the 3rd Critics' Choice Real TV Awards.

Continuation
In a slightly altered format, a continuation of the program began airing in July 2021 on Discovery+ as Martha Gets Down and Dirty.

References

External links
 
 Martha Knows Best on HGTV

2020 American television series debuts
2020 American television series endings
2020s American reality television series
Martha Stewart Living Omnimedia
HGTV original programming